Debralee Scott (April 2, 1953 – April 5, 2005) was an American comedic actress best known for her roles on the sitcoms Welcome Back, Kotter; Angie; Mary Hartman, Mary Hartman; and Forever Fernwood.

Career
Scott was born and raised in Elizabeth, New Jersey, and later lived in Stroudsburg, Pennsylvania, where she was a cheerleader. At age 22, she found fame on Mary Hartman, Mary Hartman playing Mary's sister Cathy Shumway. She appeared on the first season of the sitcom Welcome Back, Kotter as Rosalie "Hotsy" Totsy, guest-starred in an episode of Gibbsville in 1976 and played Angie's younger sister Marie Falco in the Donna Pescow situation comedy Angie.

Among her feature-film credits were the 1973 feature film American Graffiti, the 1974 film Earthquake, and the 1984 film Police Academy.

Scott was a fixture on the game-show circuit in the late 1970s and early 1980s, frequently serving as a celebrity guest on shows including Match Game, The $20,000 Pyramid, Riddlers, and Password Plus.

Scott also appeared on Celebrity Family Feud on November 4, 1979 with the cast of Angie. The cast of Angie took on the cast of The Ropers.  In the Fast Money round, she got 176 points out of the 200 needed to win.  Partner Robert Hays only needed 24 points as they won $10,000 for their charity. In the final Fast Money round of the special event, she scored 234 points all by herself, getting 4 of the 5 most popular answers and winning before Hays ever got a chance to play. Host Richard Dawson noted that she was the first celebrity player and the fourth player in the show's history to win a Fast Money round single-handedly.

For a while, Scott continued to work in front of the camera, appearing in two Police Academy movies, but she later retired and chose a career behind the camera, becoming an agent for a company in New York City called Empowered Artists.

In 2000, Scott appeared on a panel with her former Mary Hartman, Mary Hartman castmates at the Museum of Television and Radio in Beverly Hills.

Death 
Scott's fiancé John Dennis Levi, a police officer with the Port Authority of New York and New Jersey, died in the September 11, 2001 attacks.

In 2005, Scott moved to Florida to live with her sister. Shortly after her arrival, Scott fell into a coma and was hospitalized. She recovered and was released from the hospital on her birthday. Three days later, on April 5, 2005, she took a nap and died in her sleep. Her body was cremated.

Her fiancé's mother later stated that Scott had a drinking problem that led to her developing cirrhosis, which led to her death. Her sister Jerri added that "she never did get over Dennis' death".

Filmography

Film

Television

References

External links

1953 births
2005 deaths
American film actresses
American television actresses
Actresses from New Jersey
Actresses from New York City
People from Brooklyn
Actors from Elizabeth, New Jersey
20th-century American actresses
21st-century American women